Staszic Palace is an edifice at ulica Nowy Świat 72, Warsaw, Poland. It is the seat of the Polish Academy of Sciences.

History

Origin
The history of the Staszic Palace dates from 1620, when King Sigismund III of Poland ordered the construction of a small Eastern Orthodox chapel, as an appropriate burial place for the former Tsar Vasili IV of Russia and his brother, Dmitry Shuisky, who had died in Polish custody after having been captured several years earlier during the Polish-Muscovite War of 1605-18.

As the Polish capital's population was mostly Catholic, Protestant or Jewish, there was little call for an Orthodox chapel, and in 1668 another Polish king, John II Casimir, transferred the chapel to the Dominican Order, who were caretakers of the building until 1808.

19th century

In 1818 the building was purchased by Stanisław Staszic, a leading figure of the Polish Enlightenment, who commissioned its renovation. The architect in charge was Antonio Corazzi, who redesigned the palace in neoclassical style. After the renovation (1820–23), Staszic donated the building to the Society of Friends of Science, the first Polish learned society dedicated to Science, founded in 1800.

On 11 May 1830 the diplomat and polymath, Julian Ursyn Niemcewicz, unveiled Bertel Thorvaldsen's monument to Nicolaus Copernicus in front of the palace.

After the November 1830 Uprising against the occupying Russian Empire, the Society was banned by the Russian authorities; they had controlled Warsaw for most of the time since the final partition of Poland in 1795. For the following 26 years, the palace was used by the organisers of a lottery.

In 1857–62 the palace was the seat of the Academy of Medical science, the first institution of higher learning re-established in the Russian partition (all institutions of higher learning having been banned following the 1830 Uprising); but the Academy was soon closed after yet another failed insurrection, the 1863-4 "January Uprising".

Until the end of World War I, the building housed a gymnasium. From 1890 it was the site of an Orthodox church. In 1892–93 the palace was renovated by the Russian authorities. In line with the ongoing Russification of Warsaw, architect Mikhail Pokrovsky remodelled the palace in Russo-Byzantine style.

20th century

After Poland regained independence in 1918, in 1924–26 the palace was brought back to a neoclassical style by architect Marian Lalewicz, similar to its original design. In the Interbellum it hosted several scientific and scholarly organizations: the Warsaw Scientific Society, the Mianowski Fund, the National Meteorological Institute, the French Institute, and the Archeological Museum of Warsaw.

The palace was damaged during the 1939 siege of Warsaw and nearly razed during the 1944 Warsaw Uprising. In 1946–50 it was rebuilt in its original neoclassical form. Today it is the seat of the Polish Academy of Sciences.

Notes

External links

 Gallery of photos and a history

Palaces in Warsaw
Religious buildings and structures completed in 1823
Neoclassical architecture in Warsaw
Rebuilt buildings and structures in Poland
Polish Academy of Sciences
1620 establishments in the Polish–Lithuanian Commonwealth